Ali Hikmet Ayerdem (1877; Larissa – March 21, 1939; Istanbul) was an officer of the Ottoman Army and a general of the Turkish Army.

See also
List of high-ranking commanders of the Turkish War of Independence

Sources

External links

1877 births
1939 deaths
Military personnel from Larissa
Ottoman Military Academy alumni
Ottoman Military College alumni
Ottoman Army officers
Ottoman military personnel of the Balkan Wars
Ottoman military personnel of World War I
Turkish military personnel of the Greco-Turkish War (1919–1922)
Recipients of the Medal of Independence with Red Ribbon (Turkey)
Turkish Army generals
Deputies of Gaziantep
Burials at Turkish State Cemetery
Deputies of Bursa